Elías Mauricio Soto Uribe (born September 22, 1858 in Cúcuta, Colombia; died October 11, 1944 in the same city) played siren, bugle, trombone and tuba, piano, guitar and organ in several bands.  He was also the director of the Departmental Band of Norte de Santander in Cúcuta.

One of his notable works is the bambuco "Brisas del Pamplonita" (in English "Breezes of the Pamplonita") composed for Elisa Ramirez, who he would eventually marry.  Oriol Rangel included it for its degree of pianist in the National Conservatory.

References

1858 births
1944 deaths
People from Cúcuta
Colombian musicians